Fernando Antogna (born December 21, 1976 in Chivilcoy, Buenos Aires Province) is a male professional track and road cyclist from Argentina.

Career

2002
3rd in Doble Difunta Corréa (ARG)
2003
2nd in Stage 5 Vuelta a San Juan, San Juan (ARG)
2nd in General Classification Vuelta de San Juan (ARG)
3rd in Stage 5 part A Clásica del Oeste-Doble Bragado, Bragado (ARG)
3rd in General Classification Clásica del Oeste-Doble Bragado (ARG)
1st in Stage 1 Vuelta a Mendoza (ARG)
2nd in Stage 2 Vuelta a Mendoza (ARG)
3rd in  National Championship, Track, Pursuit, Elite/U23, Cordoba (ARG)
3rd in  National Championship, Track, Points race, Elite/U23, Cordoba (ARG)
1st in Prologue Vuelta al Valle, Allen (ARG)
1st in Stage 1 Vuelta al Valle, Allen (ARG)
1st in Stage 4 Vuelta al Valle, Catriel (ARG)
1st in General Classification Vuelta al Valle (ARG)
2005
1st in Stage 3 Clásica del Oeste-Doble Bragado, Pergamino (ARG)
2nd in Stage 6 part A Clásica del Oeste-Doble Bragado (ARG)
2nd in General Classification Clásica del Oeste-Doble Bragado (ARG)
 in Pan American Championships, Track, Team Pursuit, Mar del Plata (ARG)
2006
1st in Stage 2 Clásica del Oeste-Doble Bragado, Chacabuco (ARG)
1st in Stage 3 Clásica del Oeste-Doble Bragado, Pergamino (ARG)
3rd in Stage 6 Vuelta Ciclista Por Un Chile Lider, Sewel (CHI)
2nd in Stage 1 Doble San Francisco-Miramar (ARG)
2nd in General Classification Doble San Francisco-Miramar (ARG)
 in Pan American Championships, Track, Team Pursuit, Sao Paulo (BRA)
2007
1st in Prologue Tour de San Luis, San Luis (ARG)
1st in Stage 2 Tour de San Luis, Quines (ARG)
2nd in General Classification Tour de San Luis (ARG)
2nd in Stage 1 Clásica del Oeste-Doble Bragado, Mercedes (ARG)
3rd in Stage 2 Clásica del Oeste-Doble Bragado, Chacabuco (ARG)
3rd in Stage 6 part a Clásica del Oeste-Doble Bragado, Bragado (ARG)
3rd in General Classification Clásica del Oeste-Doble Bragado (ARG)
2nd in 100 Km de la Republica Argentina (ARG)
1st in Clasica 1° de Mayo Argentina (ARG)
  in Pan American Games, Track, Individual Pursuit, Rio de Janeiro (BRA)
1st in Stage 1 Vuelta al Valle, Allén (ARG)
1st in Stage 3 Vuelta al Valle, Allén (ARG)
2008
2nd in Prologue Tour de San Luis, San Luis (ARG)
1st in Prologue Clásica del Oeste-Doble Bragado, Suipacha (ARG)
2nd in 100 Km de la Republica Argentina (ARG)
2009
5th in General Classification Giro del Sol San Juan (ARG)
3rd in Stage 2 Giro del Sol San Juan, San Juan (ARG)
1st in Stage 2 Clásica del Oeste-Doble Bragado, Chacabuco (ARG)
2nd in Stage 5 Clásica del Oeste-Doble Bragado, Bragado (ARG)
1st in Stage 6 part a Clásica del Oeste-Doble Bragado (ARG)
2nd in General Classification Clásica del Oeste-Doble Bragado (ARG)
2nd in Memorial Julio Lino Latorre (ARG)
1st in General Clásica  Mochila Armagno (ARG)

References
 

1976 births
Living people
Argentine male cyclists
Argentine track cyclists
Cyclists at the 2007 Pan American Games
Pan American Games bronze medalists for Argentina
Sportspeople from Buenos Aires Province
Pan American Games medalists in cycling
South American Games bronze medalists for Argentina
South American Games medalists in cycling
Competitors at the 2010 South American Games
Medalists at the 2007 Pan American Games